Mary Vivian Pearce (born November 9, 1947) is an American actress. She has worked primarily in the films of John Waters.

Life and career 

Pearce is a childhood best friend of Waters and has appeared as an actress in all of his films. Because of her work with Waters, she is considered one of the Dreamlanders, Waters' ensemble of regular cast and crew members. Along with Mink Stole, she is one of only two actors to appear in all of his films to date. Pearce is always credited by her real name, but in her personal life, she is known as Bonnie. Her first film with Waters, in 1964, was a 17-minute independent short film called Hag in a Black Leather Jacket. The film was never released. In the rest of Waters' films, she's played both main and bit parts.

Her most famous roles were in Waters' Mondo Trasho, Multiple Maniacs, Pink Flamingos, Female Trouble and Desperate Living. However, as the years progressed, Pearce appeared less and less in Waters' films, usually as an extra or a character without a major impact on the plot. She continues to appear in Waters' films; she appeared as a protester in Cecil B. Demented just weeks after brain surgery.

Personal life 
At the age of eighteen, Pearce was married to a jockey who worked at Saratoga. In an interview with Gerald Peary, Pearce explained that she left for Provincetown to live with Waters and his then-girlfriend, Mona Montgomery:

I was 18, and it was three months after I got married. My husband was a jockey at Saratoga, and he told my father I'd left him and run off with beatniks. I was so pissed at him for telling! As far as I was concerned, it was a fake marriage to get me out of the house. I'd taken all our wedding presents back and bought books and records.

Pearce's alma mater is Goucher College. She has a graduate degree in creative writing. She lives in Baltimore, Maryland, with her sister and brother-in-law.

Filmography 

 Hag in a Black Leather Jacket (1964) (unreleased) as Bodie green dancer
 Roman Candles (1966) (unreleased) as a Model
 Eat Your Makeup (1968) (unreleased) as a Kidnapped model
 Mondo Trasho (1969) as The Bombshell
 The Diane Linkletter Story (1969) as Mrs. Linkletter
 Multiple Maniacs (1970) as Bonnie/Cavalcade Patron
 Pink Flamingos (1972) as Cotton
 Female Trouble (1974) as Donna Dasher
 Desperate Living (1977) as Princess Coo Coo
 Polyester (1981) as Nun in unwed mothers home
 Hairspray (1988) as Hairhopper Mother
 Cry-Baby (1990) as Picnic Mother (scene later removed)
 Serial Mom (1994) as Book Buyer
 Pecker (1998) as Homophobe
 Divine Trash (1998) as herself
 Cecil B. DeMented (2000) as Family Lady
 A Dirty Shame (2004) as Non-judgmental sex addict at meeting
 I Am Divine (2013) as herself
 Squirrel (2017) as Mrs. Mueller an evil high school principal

References

External links 
 

1947 births
Living people
American film actresses
Goucher College alumni
Place of birth missing (living people)
20th-century American actresses
21st-century American actresses
American expatriates in Nicaragua